Niharica Raizada (born 18 April 1990)  is a Luxembourger actress. She was crowned as Miss India UK 2010 and was runner-up at Miss India Worldwide 2010. She is the granddaughter of former Bollywood musician O. P. Nayyar. She has worked in films like Masaan, 6-5=2, Damadol, Total Dhamaal (2018) and Sooryavanshi (2021).

Early life
Niharica is the granddaughter of music composer O. P. Nayyar. She was born to Indian parents and was raised in Luxembourg. Her mother tongue is French and she also speaks Luxembourgish, German, English, Spanish, and Hindi. She has a sister Nirekhna Raizada and a brother Avneesh Raizada. She is a Medical Scientist by qualification and studied MRes in Translational Medicine at Imperial College London, and then did research in Cardiology at Johns Hopkins University (Baltimore), under a Fulbright scholarship. She got training in acting from New York Film Academy. She is trained in Indian classical music and ballet. Niharica was crowned Miss India UK 2010 and was also the first runner-up of Miss India Worldwide 2010. Niharica released one song for the brand Chambor in French. She was ranked 45 in the list of Times 50 Most Desirable Women of 2013, and rose to 44 in 2015.

Niharica made her film debut in a Bengali film Damadol in 2013. She acted in a Gujarati film Var to NRI J in 2016. Niharica has done a film titled Full 2 Jugaadu in 2016 with Krushna Abhishek.

She is the honorary cultural and arts ambassador between the Grand Duchy of Luxembourg and the Republic of India.

Filmography

Films

Web series

References

External links
 
 
 
 

Living people
1990 births
People from Luxembourg City
Luxembourgian film actresses
Luxembourgian television actresses
Luxembourgian people of Indian descent
Luxembourgian expatriates in India
Actresses in Hindi cinema
Actresses in Bengali cinema
Actresses in Gujarati cinema
Actresses in Telugu cinema
Actresses of Indian descent
European actresses in India
Johns Hopkins University alumni
Alumni of Imperial College London
New York Film Academy alumni
Luxembourgian expatriates in the United Kingdom
21st-century Luxembourgian actresses
Fulbright alumni